Jeff Ward is an American actor. He is best known for his starring roles as Charles Manson in Manson's Lost Girls (2016), Seth Marlowe in Channel Zero: No-End House (2017), and Deke Shaw in Marvel's Agents of S.H.I.E.L.D. (2017–2020).

Early life and education
Ward was born in Washington, D.C., and grew up in Radnor, Pennsylvania, a suburb of Philadelphia, where he began acting in theatrical productions. He has one younger sister who is a third grade teacher. Ward attended Tisch School of the Arts along with fellow actor Miles Teller. He is also an alumnus of Stella Adler School for Acting.

Career
Ward received recognition after he was cast as Charles Manson in the 2016 TV movie Manson's Lost Girls, a role he accepted because he felt that "people inherently have a slightly dark side."

In 2017, he starred as Seth Marlowe in the critically acclaimed horror anthology series Channel Zero: No-End House.

Later in 2017, he was cast as Deke Shaw on the Marvel Cinematic Universe television series Agents of S.H.I.E.L.D. in a recurring role during season five. Originally he was cast as Virgil, a minor character who dies in the first episode of the season, but during the table read of the episode, the main cast felt that Ward "nailed it" as Virgil and wanted him to stay on as Deke, who had not yet been cast. After the reading, the producers reached out to Ward and offered him to audition for Deke, which ended in him ultimately being cast in the part. Ward was promoted to series regular for season six, and returned in that capacity for the seventh and final season.

In November 2019, it was announced that Ward would appear in a main role on the Netflix horror drama miniseries Brand New Cherry Flavor. The miniseries was released on August 13, 2021.

Filmography

Film

Television

References

External links

Male actors from Pennsylvania
Male actors from Washington, D.C.
American male film actors
American male television actors
Living people
Year of birth missing (living people)